AB-CHMINACA is an indazole-based synthetic cannabinoid. It is a potent agonist of the CB1 receptor (Ki = 0.78 nM) and CB2 receptor (Ki = 0.45 nM) and fully substitutes for Δ9-THC in rat discrimination studies, while being 16x more potent. Continuing the trend seen in other cannabinoids of this generation, such as AB-FUBINACA and AB-PINACA, it contains a valine amino acid amide residue as part of its structure, where older cannabinoids contained a naphthyl or adamantane residue.

Side effects 
There have been a number of reported cases of seizures, deaths, and psychotic episodes in relation to this synthetic cannabinoid.

Legal status 
In 2015, AB-CHMINACA became a Schedule I controlled substance in the United States.

AB-CHMINACA is an Anlage II controlled substance in Germany as of May 2015.

As of October 2015 AB-CHMINACA is a controlled substance in China.

AB-CHMINACA is illegal in Switzerland as of December 2015.

AB-CHMINACA is an illegal substance in Russian Federation.

See also 

 5F-AB-PINACA
 5F-ADB
 5F-AMB
 A-CHMINACA
 AB-FUBINACA
 AB-CHFUPYCA
 AB-PINACA
 ADB-CHMINACA
 ADB-FUBINACA
 ADB-PINACA
 ADBICA
 APICA
 APINACA
 MDMB-CHMICA
 MDMB-CHMINACA
 MDMB-FUBINACA
 PX-3

References 

Cannabinoids
Designer drugs
Indazolecarboxamides
Cyclohexyl compounds